Emmanuel Amankwaa Akurugu (born 20 November 2001), sometimes known as Koffi or Kofi, is a Ghanaian footballer who plays as a left back for Spanish club Getafe CF B.

Career
Born in Accra, Akurugu joined Getafe CF in 2020, from hometown side Ashaiman School. In Spain, he began his sports career in the talent search project of La Moraleja C.F. who bet on him and his abilities as a footballer. Initially assigned to the reserves, he made his senior debut on 18 October 2020, starting in a 1–2 Segunda División B home loss against CF Rayo Majadahonda.

Akurugu made his first team – and La Liga – debut on 22 April 2021, coming on as a half-time substitute for Marc Cucurella in a 2–5 away loss against FC Barcelona.

Career statistics

Club

References

External links
 
 

2001 births
Living people
Footballers from Accra
Ghanaian footballers
Association football defenders
La Liga players
Segunda División B players
Getafe CF B players
Getafe CF footballers
Ghanaian expatriate footballers
Ghanaian expatriate sportspeople in Spain
Expatriate footballers in Spain